Nicola Spiess married Werdenigg (born 29 July 1958) is an Austrian former alpine skier.

Career

During her career she has achieved 17 results among the top 10 (4 podiums) in the World Cup. She competed in the 1976 Winter Olympics and was 4th in downhill. She retired from the competitive skiing at 21.

The denunciation of sexual abuse
In 2017, after the Weinstein scandal, she talked about the sexual abuse suffered by members of the Austrian Alpine Ski Team in the 1970s. She also wrote a book on the subject: Ski Macht Spiele (Ski power games).

World Cup results
Podiums

National titles
Spiess has won one national championships at individual senior level.

Austria Alpine Ski Championships
Downhill: 1975

References

External links
 
 

1958 births
Living people
Austrian female alpine skiers
Olympic alpine skiers of Austria
Alpine skiers at the 1976 Winter Olympics
Sportspeople from Innsbruck
20th-century Austrian women